18 rating refers to a type of age-based content rating that applies to media entertainment, such as films, television shows and computer games. The following articles document the rating across a range of countries and mediums:

Ratings
 18 (British Board of Film Classification), a prohibitive rating used to regulate age based admission to films in the United Kingdom and Ireland 
 R18 (British Board of Film Classification), a more restrictive rating used for hardcore pornography in the United Kingdom
 X rating, a common variant of the UK's 18 and R18 ratings used across many countries

Classification organizations
 Australian Classification Board (R18+ and X18+)
 Brazilian advisory rating system (18)
 British Board of Film Classification (18 and R18)
 Canadian motion picture rating system 
Canadian Home Video Rating System (18A, R and A – 18 equivalents)
Manitoba Film Classification Board (18A, R and A)
Maritime Film Classification Board (18A, R and A)
British Columbia Film Classification Office (18A, R and A)
Saskatchewan Film and Video Classification Board (18A, R and A)
Ontario Film Review Board (18A, R and A)
Régie du cinéma (Quebec) (18+)
 Central Board of Film Certification (A – 18 equivalent)
 Common Sense Media (18+)
 Computer Entertainment Rating Organization (Z – 18 equivalent)
 Conseil supérieur de l'audiovisuel (18)
 Dirección General de Radio, Televisión y Cinematografía (C and D – 18 equivalents)
 Eirin (R18+)
 Entertainment Software Rating Board (Adults Only – 18 equivalent)
 Film Censorship Board of Malaysia (18)
 Freiwillige Selbstkontrolle der Filmwirtschaft (18)
 Hong Kong motion picture rating system (III – 18 equivalent)
 Irish Film Classification Office (18)
 Korea Media Rating Board (R – 18 equivalent)
 Media Development Authority (M18)
 Motion Picture Association of America film rating system (NC17 – 18 equivalent)
 Movie and Television Review and Classification Board (R-18)
 National Audiovisual Institute (Finland) (18)
 National Bureau of Classification (NBC) (18+ and 18+R)
 National Institute of Cinema and Audiovisual Arts (18)
 Norwegian Media Authority (18)
 Office of Film and Literature Classification (New Zealand) (R18 and RP18)
 Pan European Game Information (18)
 Unterhaltungssoftware Selbstkontrolle (18)

Systems
 Motion picture content rating system, a range of classification systems for films that commonly use the age 18 as part of its regulatory criteria
 Television content rating system, a range of classification systems for television broadcasts that commonly use the age 18 as part of its regulatory criteria
 Video game content rating system, a range of classification systems for video games that commonly use the age 18 as part of its regulatory criteria
 Mobile software content rating system, a range of classification systems for mobile software that commonly use the age 18 as part of its regulatory criteria

See also
Adults Only (disambiguation)
R18 (disambiguation)
Censorship in France

 rating systems
Censorship